There are currently 19 county councils in Hungary, covering areas known as megyék (urban and rural administrative areas). The first county councils were created in 1889. The Local Governments of Hungary Law of 1990 established county councils Hungary.  The number of seats in each council was decreased due to incremental reforms carried out in 2010.

References 

Local government in Hungary
Politics of Hungary
County councils
County councils
County councils